Veronique Meester (born 7 April 1995) is a Dutch rower. She was a member of the Dutch coxless four, along with Ellen Hogerwerf, Ymkje Clevering and Karolien Florijn, that won an Olympic silver medal in Tokyo 2020. The same crew was a three-time European Champion (in 2019, 2020 and 2021) and won a silver medal at the 2019 World Rowing Championships. In August 2022 Meester and her former coxless four teammate Ymkje Clevering won the bronze medal in the coxless pair at the European Championships in Munich.

References

External links

1995 births
Living people
Dutch female rowers
World Rowing Championships medalists for the Netherlands
Rowers at the 2020 Summer Olympics
Medalists at the 2020 Summer Olympics
Olympic medalists in rowing
Olympic silver medalists for the Netherlands
21st-century Dutch women